Sarah Hildreth Butler (born Sarah Jones Hildreth, August 17, 1816 – April 8, 1876) was an American stage actress. She was the wife of Benjamin Franklin Butler, a Massachusetts lawyer, controversial Union general in the American Civil War, and a United States Congressman representing Massachusetts from 1867 to 1875 and again from 1877 to 1879.

Life
Sarah Hildreth was born in Dracut, Massachusetts, the daughter of Dr. Israel Hildreth, a noted physician of the Lowell area, and Dolly Jones. At sixteen, she went to Boston for formal training in dramatics, performing all over the country. On May 16, 1844, she married Benjamin Butler, then a rising lawyer, at Saint Anne's Episcopal Church in Lowell; she was 27, he 25. The Butlers would have four children, three surviving to adulthood: Blanche (1847–1939), who would marry Adelbert Ames; Paul (1852–1918; their first son, also named Paul, had died in 1850 at the age of five); and Ben-Israel (1855–1881). She retired from stage performance after her marriage.

Sarah Butler, urged her husband Benjamin Butler in pursue his political ambitions in the Lincoln administration, but this effort came to an end with Lincoln's assassination in April 1865. In March 1866, Butler argued in the U.S. Supreme Court on behalf of the United States in Ex parte Milligan, in which the Court held, against the United States, that military commission trials could not replace civilian trials when courts were open and where there was no war. Butler then turned his eyes to Congress and was elected in 1866 on a platform of civil rights and opposition to President Andrew Johnson's weak Reconstruction policies. She also encourage, Butler's supported of a variety of social reform positions, including women's suffrage and the eight-hour workday for federal employees.

Death
Sarah Hildreth Butler died on April 8, 1876, at the age of 59, and is buried at her family's private cemetery in Lowell.

References

External links

Sarah Jones Hildreth Butler | Civil War Women Blog

1816 births
1876 deaths
Sarah
19th-century American actresses
American stage actresses
Actors from Lowell, Massachusetts
Butler–Ames family
First Ladies and Gentlemen of Massachusetts